This is a list of issue covers of TV Guide magazine from the decade of the 2000s, from January 2000 to December 2009.  The entries on this table include each cover's subjects and their artists (photographer or illustrator).  This list is for the regular weekly issues of TV Guide, and includes covers that are national or regional in nature, along with any covers that were available exclusively to subscribers.  Any one-time-only special issues of TV Guide are not included.

From the beginning of this decade until the 4/3/2004 cover, dates indicated fell on a Saturday (the TV listings were in a Saturday-to-Friday pattern).  Issue dates from 4/11/2004 to 10/9/2005 fell on a Sunday (Sunday-to-Saturday listings).  Issue dates from 10/17/2005 onward fall on a Monday (Monday-to-Sunday listings).

NOTE: Beginning in 2006, TV Guide occasionally produced 2-week "double issues."  Such issue dates are indicated in bold italics, with listings covering that week and the following week.

2000

2001

2002

2003

2004

2005

2006

2007

2008

2009

Sources
The TV Guide magazine website
2000s section of the TV Guide cover archive
TV Guide: Fifty Years of Television, New York: Crown Publishers, 2002. 
Stephen Hofer, ed., TV Guide: The Official Collectors Guide, Braintree, Massachusetts: BangZoom Publishers, 2006.  .
"50 Greatest TV Guide Covers", article from the June 15, 2002 edition of TV Guide
Information from ellwanger.tv's TV Guide collection section
TV Guide cover list as shown on pastpaper.com

Covers
2000s television-related lists
2000s in American television
TV Guide